Cristo Rey Atlanta Jesuit High School is a college preparatory school located in Atlanta, Georgia, United States. Opened in 2014, it is in the Cristo Rey Network of schools, with work-study integrated into its program. It serves only low-income students and financial need is a first criterion for admission.

History
Cristo Rey Atlanta opened in 2014 under the auspices of the Society of Jesus (Jesuits) in midtown Atlanta, in a three-story building that was formerly the chancery building for the Archdiocese of Atlanta.

As the demand for its services expanded, the school accepted the donation of a much larger, seven-story building in downtown Atlanta. The new building was officially dedicated on January 30, 2018 with Mayor Keisha Lance Bottoms and Governor Nathan Deal attending the ceremony.

Corporate Work Study Program 
The Corporate Work Study Program is the central focus of the school, paying for most of the student's tuition and giving valuable work experience. Students go to their job partner, with one student from each grade level going once a week on their designated work day, Tuesday to Friday. The students rotate on Monday, resulting in each student going five times a month. Job partners include Coca-Cola, Emory University, and Delta Air Lines.

Extracurricular activities
Boys: basketball, baseball, cross country, soccer, taekwondo, cheer 
Girls: soccer, cross country' volleyball, cheer, basketball, taekwondo

References

Further reading
 Kearney, G. R. More Than a Dream: The Cristo Rey Story: How One School's Vision Is Changing the World. Chicago, Ill: Loyola Press, 2008.

External links
 School website
 Cristo Rey Network
 Bill & Melinda Gates Foundation - Success of Innovative Urban Catholic School Sparks Major Investment
https://www.cbsnews.com/news/in-a-class-by-itself/
http://candler.emory.edu/academics/con-ed/con-ed-II/sites/con-ed-II-sites_cristo-rey-atlanta.html

Cristo Rey Network
Jesuit high schools in the United States
Educational institutions established in 2014
Schools in Atlanta
Poverty-related organizations
Catholic secondary schools in Georgia (U.S. state)
2014 establishments in Georgia (U.S. state)